Hanmann is a surname. Notable people with the surname include: 

Charlotte Hanmann (born 1950), Danish photographer, painter and graphic artist
Inger Hanmann (1918–2007), Danish artist

See also
Hamann